Events in the year 2019 in Switzerland.

Incumbents
President of the Swiss Confederation: Ueli Maurer
President of the National Council: Marina Carobbio Guscetti
President of the Swiss Council of States: Jean-René Fournier

Events
22 September — A 'funeral' and mourning ceremony was held for the Pizol glacier which has disappeared due to rising temperatures.
20 October – Scheduled date for the 2019 Swiss federal election  
25 November – present 2019 Sri Lankan Swiss embassy controversy.

Sports
1 January – Stage 3 of 2018–19 Tour de Ski was held in Val Müstair

19 to 25 August – Scheduled date for the 2019 BWF World Championships, to be held in Basel
7 to 15 December – Scheduled date for the 2019 Women's World Floorball Championships, to be held in Neuchâtel

Deaths

1 January – , photographer (b. 1940).

4 January – , musician (b. 1959).

5 January – , historian (b. 1928).

10 January – , politician (b. 1928).

18 January – , literary scholar (b. 1931).

29 January – Otto Schubiger, ice hockey player (b. 1925).

15 February – Bruno Ganz, actor (Wings of Desire, Downfall, The Manchurian Candidate) (b. 1941), colorectal cancer.

20 April – Karl Grob, footballer (b. 1946).

References

 
2010s in Switzerland
Years of the 21st century in Switzerland
Switzerland
Switzerland